José Simón Pardo y Barreda (February 24, 1864 – August 3, 1947) was a Peruvian politician who served as the 35th (1904–1908) and 39th (1915–1919) President of Peru.

Biography
Born in Lima, Peru, he was the son of Manuel Justo Pardo y Lavalle, who had been the first civilian president of Peru (1872-1876) and the founder the Civilista Party; he is one of two second-generation Peruvian presidents (Manuel Prado, son of former dictator Mariano Ignacio Prado, is the other).  His grandfather, Felipe Pardo y Aliaga (1806-1868), was a distinguished diplomat, writer and  politician who was also Foreign Minister and Vice President of the Peruvian Council of State before, during and after the presidencies of Vivanco and Castilla.

José Pardo headed the Civilista Party and was Foreign Minister under Eduardo López de Romaña and then Prime Minister (1903-1904) under Manuel Candamo. After Candamo's death, Serapio Calderón became the interim president and called for new elections. The Civilista Party named José Pardo as its candidate, while the Democratic Party presented the candidacy of Nicolás de Piérola, who retired early before the elections mentioning a "lack of guarantees." This fact led Pardo to become elected. Both his presidential terms were marked by liberal politics.
 
His government was marked by pushing for better education for all Peruvians. The elementary education in Peru, according to the Law of 1876 proposed by his father, Manuel Pardo, was under the responsibility of the municipalities throughout the country. José Pardo, under his Secretary of Justice and instruction, decided to confront the problem.

The law promulgated in 1905 reformed the education system to depend on the Central Government. It also called for primary education to be free and compulsory in far away places such as villages and mines, and that at least a small school for all children be located in any place with more than two hundred inhabitants. The Escuela Normal de Varones ("Normal school for males") was founded for the formation of male teachers, as well as the Escuela Normal de Mujeres ("Normal school for females").

Pardo created a General Branch of Instruction to where inspectors in charge of the work of surveillance in the whole Republic depended. In the cultural field the following were established: The National Academy of History, the School of Fine Arts (Bellas Artes), the National Academy of Music, and the National Museum of History. The superior combat school was also founded to form major state officers.

During his second government José Pardo confronted the consequences of the First World War, as well as the labor agitation for the obtainment of the "8 working hours" a day. It was finally granted on January 15, 1919.

With barely a month before the end of his second term, he was ousted in a coup by Augusto B. Leguía. He spent the next eleven years in exile in the South of France, until his return to Lima. He died there in 1947.

In 1900, Pardo married his first cousin, Carmen Heeren Barreda. The marriage produced seven children: Manuel, José (the Marquis of Fuente Hermosa de Miranda, until his death in 1999), Enrique, Carmen, Juan, Oscar and Felipe.  The current Marquis, José Pardo Paredes (born 1947), is one of President Jose Pardo's grandchildren.

See also
 Politics of Peru
 List of presidents of Peru

References

External links

Presidents of Peru
1864 births
1947 deaths
Pardo family
Lavalle family
Peruvian people of Spanish descent
Civilista Party politicians
Foreign ministers of Peru
Prime Ministers of Peru
National University of San Marcos alumni
Academic staff of the National University of San Marcos
Politicians from Lima